The canton of Ornans is an administrative division of the Doubs department, eastern France. Its borders were modified at the French canton reorganisation which came into effect in March 2015. Its seat is in Ornans.

It consists of the following communes:
 
Les Alliés
Amancey
Amathay-Vésigneux
Amondans
Arçon
Arc-sous-Cicon
Aubonne
Bians-les-Usiers
Bolandoz
Bugny
Cademène
Chantrans
Chassagne-Saint-Denis
Châteauvieux-les-Fossés
La Chaux
Cléron
Crouzet-Migette
Déservillers
Durnes
Échevannes
Éternoz
Évillers
Fertans
Flagey
Gevresin
Gilley
Goux-les-Usiers
Hauterive-la-Fresse
L'Hôpital-du-Grosbois
Lavans-Vuillafans
Lizine
Lods
Longeville
La Longeville
Maisons-du-Bois-Lièvremont
Malans
Malbrans
Montbenoît
Montflovin
Montgesoye
Montmahoux
Les Monts-Ronds
Mouthier-Haute-Pierre
Nans-sous-Sainte-Anne
Ornans
Ouhans
Renédale
Reugney
Sainte-Anne
Saint-Gorgon-Main
Saraz, Doubs
Saules
Scey-Maisières
Septfontaines
Silley-Amancey
Sombacour
Tarcenay-Foucherans
Trépot
Ville-du-Pont
Vuillafans

References

Cantons of Doubs